Giacomo di Ser Michele (active early 15th century) was an Italian painter of the Quattrocento, active in Umbria.
 
He is documented painting in Città di Castello along with Giorgio of Siena, the son of Andrea di Bartolo.

References

Year of birth missing
Year of death missing
15th-century Italian painters
Italian male painters
Umbrian painters